The Guaricana National Park is a national park in the state of Paraná, Brazil.
It protects a mountainous area holding a remnant of Atlantic Forest.

Location

The Guaricana National Park covers parts of the municipalities of Guaratuba (67.49% of the park), Morretes (19.47%) and São José dos Pinhais (13.04%) in the state of Paraná.
It is west of the Saint-Hilaire/Lange National Park, south of highway BR-277, and east of highway BR-376. Guaratuba Bay is to the south east.

The park lies in the mountains that rise to the east of the interior plateau of Curitiba.
The terrain is mountainous, cut by deep valleys.
The whole of the park is in the littoral basin of Paraná, mainly the catchments of the Cubatão and Cubatãozinho rivers.
A small part of the northeast holds the basins of the Pinto and Sagrado rivers, which flow north into Paranaguá Bay.

The park is in the Atlantic Forest biome.
The park is in the contact zone between mixed rainforest with Araucaria and dense Atlantic rainforest at the lower levels.
There is sparser vegetation and alpine meadows on the higher parts of the Canavieiras and Igreja ranges.

History

The Guaricana National Park was created by presidential decree on 13 October 2014.
It is administered by the Chico Mendes Institute for Biodiversity Conservation (ICMBio).
It is classed as IUCN protected area category II (national park).
The purpose is to ensure preservation of remnants of dense rain forest and mixed deciduous forest including flora, fauna, water and geological resources, and associated natural landscapes.

Notes

Sources

2014 establishments in Brazil
National parks of Brazil
Protected areas of Paraná (state)
Protected areas of the Atlantic Forest